The Type DT1 is a two-car electric multiple unit (EMU) train type operated by the Hamburger Hochbahn AG on the Hamburg U-Bahn until 1991. They were the first new U-Bahn trains since the 1920s.

Technical specifications
The trains were formed as two-car sets. The car bodies are made out of welded steel. Each bogie is fitted with two axle-hung motors.

Interior
The first sets were fitted with longitudinal seating. Subsequent sets were fitted with a mix of longitudinal and transverse seats.

History
The trains were originally numbered 9431/9432 to 9529/9530, and were renumbered to 9000/9001 to 9098/9099 in 1960. Their livery was changed in 1969 to unify the look of the Hochbahn trains, with the DT1 trains receiving a grey livery with red doors and cab ends, similar to the Type DT2 and Type DT3. DT1 trains were restricted to peak-hour services since 1971. The sets still in service in the 1980s were renumbered to 501 to 544. Withdrawals began in 1987 and were finished in 1991.

Preserved examples
Set 516 was rebuilt into the Hanseat party train in 1997 to 2000. The rebuilding included retrofitting of a bar and toilet into one car, and the restoration of the other car into its original state. A gangway connection was also installed, and the train was reliveried into its original livery scheme, as well as renumbered to its original number 9030/9031.

References

External links

 Der Hanseat - Historischer U-Bahnwagen on hamburg.de 

Hamburg U-Bahn
Electric multiple units of Germany
750 V DC multiple units